The Novo River is a river of Pará state in north-central Brazil.

The Novo is a major tributary of the Jamanxim River. It is formed by the juncture of the Inambé and Marrom rivers, and has its headwaters in the Rio Novo National Park, a  conservation unit created in 2006.

See also
List of rivers of Pará

References

Brazilian Ministry of Transport

External links

Rivers of Pará